The Great Conewago Presbyterian Church is an historic Presbyterian church, which is located on Church Road near Hunterstown, Straban Township, Adams County, Pennsylvania. 

It was listed on the National Register of Historic Places in 1974.

History and architectural features
 Built in 1787, it is a six-bay-wide and three-bay-deep rectangular fieldstone building, which features rounded arched doors and windows and a rounded arch ceiling.

During the Gettysburg Campaign of the American Civil War, it was used as a Confederate Army hospital.

It was listed on the National Register of Historic Places in 1974. 

The congregation is part of the Presbyterian Church (USA).

References

External links
Great Conewago Presbyterian Church website

Presbyterian churches in Pennsylvania
Churches on the National Register of Historic Places in Pennsylvania
Churches completed in 1787
Churches in Adams County, Pennsylvania
1787 establishments in Pennsylvania
18th-century Presbyterian church buildings in the United States
National Register of Historic Places in Adams County, Pennsylvania